Fairburn may refer to:

Places
New Zealand
Fairburn, Kaitaia, New Zealand
United Kingdom
Fairburn, North Yorkshire, a village in England
Fairburn Tower, Scottish castle
United States
Fairburn, Georgia, a city
Fairburn, South Dakota, a town
Fairburn, Wisconsin, an unincorporated community

Other
LMS Fairburn 2-6-4T, a class of steam locomotive designed by Charles Fairburn built 1945-1951
RSPB Fairburn Ings, a reserve of the Royal Society for the Protection of Birds in West Yorkshire, England

See also
Fairburn (surname)
Fairbairn